The Mirage 32 is a Canadian sailboat, that was designed by American Robert Perry and first built in 1987.

The Mirage 32 is a development of the Mirage 30, with a reverse transom added.

Production
The boat was built by Mirage Yachts in Canada, starting in 1987, but is now out of production.

Design
The Mirage 32 is a small recreational keelboat, built predominantly of fiberglass. It has a masthead sloop rig, an internally-mounted spade-type rudder and a fixed fin keel. It displaces  and carries  of ballast.

The boat has a PHRF racing average handicap of 162 with a high of 156 and low of 169.

See also
List of sailing boat types

Similar sailboats
Aloha 32
Bayfield 30/32
Beneteau 323
C&C 32
Catalina 320
Columbia 32
Contest 32 CS
Douglas 32
Hunter 32 Vision
Morgan 32
Nonsuch 324
Ontario 32
Ranger 32
Watkins 32

References

External links
Photo of a Mirage 32
Photo of a Mirage 32

Keelboats
1980s sailboat type designs
Sailing yachts
Sailboat type designs by Robert Perry
Sailboat types built by Mirage Yachts